Anna Menzio (3 June 1905 – 11 November 1994), known by her stage name Wanda Osiris (Italianized as Vanda Osiri during the Fascist era), was an Italian revue soubrette, actress and singer.

Life and career
Born in Rome, the daughter of a  groom, she studied violin at a young age. She debuted on stage in 1923, in the revue Osvaldo mio mi fai morire. She was the major diva of the Italian revue between 1930s and 1950s, until a new type of soubrette, more saucy and comical, surfaced. She retired in 1975 and died in 1994 of a heart attack at the age of 89.

Selected filmography
 Non me lo dire! (1940)
 The Firemen of Viggiù (1949)
 I'm in the Revue (1950)
 Martin Toccaferro (1953)
 Carousel of Variety (1955) 
 Polvere di stelle (1973)

References

Further reading

External links 

1905 births
1994 deaths
Italian stage actresses
Italian film actresses
Actresses from Rome
20th-century Italian actresses